Pompano is a  offshore oil platform in the Gulf of Mexico. The platform was formerly owned and run by BP Exploration but sold to Stone Energy in early 2012.

See also
Offshore oil and gas in the US Gulf of Mexico

References

External links
 Vessel Details

Oil platforms off the United States
Petroleum industry in the Gulf of Mexico